Reina Mundial del Banano (World Queen of Bananas) is a beauty pageant held in Machala, Ecuador since 1985, and is restricted to banana producing countries. The pageant is broadcast in Ecuador by Canal Uno.

Titleholders

Titles By Countries

Reina Mundial Del Banano

Virreina Mundial Del Banano

Turismo Internacional

Primera Princesa

Segunda Princesa

Tercera Princesa

Cuarta Princesa

See also

 List of beauty contests

References

Beauty pageants in Ecuador
International beauty pageants
Continental beauty pageants